Meshkabad-e Qadim (also Romanized as Meshkābād-e Qadīm) is a village in Nazarkahrizi Rural District, Nazarkahrizi District, Hashtrud County, East Azerbaijan Province, Iran. At the 2006 census, its population was 58, in 9 families.

References 

Towns and villages in Hashtrud County